The 2017 Singapore Cup (also known as the RHB Singapore Cup for sponsorship reasons) is the 20th edition of Singapore's annual premier club football knock-out tournament organised by the Football Association of Singapore. Albirex Niigata (S) are the defending champions, having won their first trophy the previous year.

This will be the first time in the competition's history where both finalists are both non-Singaporean clubs.

Teams

A total of 12 teams participate in the 2017 Singapore Cup. 8 of the teams are from domestic S.League while the other four are invited from Cambodia and the Philippines. Young Lions will not be participating in this edition of the Singapore Cup.

S.League Clubs
  Albirex Niigata (S)
 Balestier Khalsa
  DPMM FC
 Geylang International
 Home United
 Hougang United
 Tampines Rovers
 Warriors FC

Invited Foreign Teams
  Boeung Ket Angkor
  Ceres Negros
  Global Cebu
  Nagaworld FC

Format

Eight teams were drawn for the preliminary round while the other four seeded teams received a bye for that round. The eight teams will play against one another in a single-legged knockout basis. Winners of this round will progress and advance to the quarter-finals. Thereafter, matches are played in two legs with the exception of the one-match final.

For any match in the knockout stage, a draw after 90 minutes of regulation time is followed by two 15 minute periods of extra time to determine a winner. If the teams are still tied, a penalty shoot-out is held to determine a winner.

Bracket

Preliminary round
The draw for the preliminary round was held on 9 May 2017 at Connaught Drive. Eight teams involved in this round will play in a single leg knockout basis. The matches will be played from 29 to 21 June 2017. Winners of this round will progress and advance to the quarter-finals.

Quarter-finals
The 4 winners from the preliminary round will join DPMM FC, Tampines Rovers, 2016 runner up, Albirex Niigata (S) and 2016 winner, Home United in the draw.

Albirex Niigata (S) won 7-1 on aggregate. 

Home United won 6-2 on aggregate.

Global Cebu won 4-3 on aggregate. 

Hougang United won 8-1 on aggregate.

Semi-finals

Albirex won 5–2 on aggregate

Global Cebu won 4–3 on aggregate

3rd/4th placing

Finals

Season statistics

Top scorers

Hat-tricks

References

Singapore Cup seasons